Aavo Mölder (born 30 March 1944 in Vasula) is an Estonian politician. He was a member of VIII Riigikogu.

References

Living people
1944 births
People's Union of Estonia politicians
Conservative People's Party of Estonia politicians
Members of the Riigikogu, 1995–1999
Agriculture ministers of Estonia
Recipients of the Order of the National Coat of Arms, 5th Class
Recipients of the Order of the White Star, 2nd Class
People from Tartu Parish
Voters of the Estonian restoration of Independence